São Miguel do Oeste is a municipality of the Brazilian state of Santa Catarina. It is located 730 km west of Florianópolis. It has a population of 40,868 (2020/IBGE) and an area of 234 kmª. It is the largest Brazilian city from the border with Argentina, and is the big city in the far-west of state.

The city was founded on 15 February 1954 by immigrants from the Brazilian state of Rio Grande do Sul, descendants of Italian and German. The name of the city is a blend of its patron saint, São Miguel Arcanjo, and the name of the district that led the city, West Village (Vila Oeste).

The city is served by Miguel Wasum Airport.

Notable people
 

Vini (born 1984), Italian Brazilian footballer

References

External links
 City hall site
 City council site
 UNOESC, local university

Municipalities in Santa Catarina (state)
Populated places established in 1954